Chateaubelair is a large fishing village on the Leeward (west) coast of the Caribbean island of Saint Vincent, the main island of Saint Vincent and the Grenadines. It is located just south of the volcano of Soufrière.  Commonly referred to as just "' Chateau", it is the focus and the largest community in the North Leeward constituency of St. Vincent, and the fourth largest town in the country.

Local attractions include Trinity Falls, Dark View Falls, and rock carvings which are an archaeological find and are believed to have been left by Kalinago.

Many activities are available year-round, spearfishing is now illegal in all of the Grenadines, more common to the Caribbean as a whole, dominoes, basketball, soccer and cricket.

The local economy is mainly supported by farming.

Chateaubelair is not a developed area, and though it has much appeal for tourists, it does not have much support.  However, anyone looking to experience true Caribbean culture instead of a manufactured offering, should consider the natural environmental beauty and friendly, genuine people of Chateaubelair.

In the 1790s, Chateaubelair was the scene of some parts of the anti-British rebellion led by Joseph Chatoyer.

See also
Saint David Parish

References

Populated places in Saint Vincent and the Grenadines